This is a list of flag bearers who have represented Tanzania at the Olympics.

Flag bearers carry the national flag of their country at the opening ceremony of the Olympic Games.

See also
Tanzania at the Olympics

References

Tanzania at the Olympics
Tanzania
Olympic flagbearers
Olympic flagbearers